Andrew Price may refer to:

Andrew Price (politician) (1854–1909), U.S. Representative from Louisiana
Andrew Price (rugby league) (born 1982), Australian sportsman
Andrew Price (TV presenter), Welsh TV presenter 
Andy Price, British composer
Andy Price (artist), American comics artist